The 2020–21 San Francisco Dons men's basketball team represented the University of San Francisco during the 2020–21 NCAA Division I men's basketball season. The Dons were led by head coach Todd Golden, his second year in the position. They played their home games at the War Memorial Gymnasium as members of the West Coast Conference.

Previous season
The Dons concluded the 2019–20 season 22–12, 9–7 in WCC play to finish in fifth place. They lost in the quarterfinals of the WCC tournament to Pepperdine. 

All postseason play was canceled due to the COVID-19 pandemic.

Offseason

Departures

Incoming transfers

2020 recruiting class

Roster

Schedule and results

|-
!colspan=9 style=| Non-conference regular season

|-
!colspan=12 style=| WCC regular season

|-
!colspan=9 style=| WCC tournament

Source:

References

San Francisco Dons men's basketball seasons
San Francisco
San Francisco Dons
San Francisco Dons
2020 in San Francisco
2021 in San Francisco